Williamstown High School may refer to:

Williamstown High School (Kentucky) — Williamstown, Kentucky
Williamstown High School (New Jersey) — Williamstown, New Jersey
Williamstown High School (West Virginia) — Williamstown, West Virginia
Williamstown High School (Victoria) — Williamstown, Victoria, Australia
Altmar-Parish-Williamstown High School — Parish, New York

See also:
Williamston High School